Hylia may refer to:

Green hylia, a species of songbird and the only species in genus Hylia
Tit hylia, a species of songbird and the only species in genus Pholidornis
Hylia (The Legend of Zelda), a fictional deity in the video game series The Legend of Zelda

See also
Hylian, race in The Legend of Zelda video game series